An avunculate marriage is a marriage with a parent's sibling or with one's sibling's child—i.e., between an uncle or aunt and their niece or nephew. Such a marriage may occur between biological (consanguine) relatives or between persons related by marriage (affinity). In some countries, avunculate marriages are prohibited by law, while in others marriages between such biological relatives are both legal and common, though now far less common.

If the partners in an avunculate marriage are biologically related, they normally have the same genetic relationship as half-siblings, or a grandparent and grandchild—that is they share approximately 25% of their genetic material. (They are therefore more closely related than partners in a marriage between first cousins, in which on average the members share 12.5% of inherited genetic material, but less than that of a marriage between, for instance, cousin-siblings, in which the partners share 37.5% of their inherited genetic material.)

Avunculate marriage is permitted in Norway, Chile, Argentina, Australia, Canada, Finland, Malaysia, The Netherlands, Germany and Russia. In the United States it is permitted in some circumstances in two states. In New York a marriage between a woman and her mother's half-brother was upheld by the New York Court of Appeals.  In Rhode Island there is an exception to the general prohibition against "kindred marriages" for Jewish marriages allowed by that religion. 
It is not permitted in New Zealand, or the United Kingdom.

History
Avunculate marriage was a preferred type of union in some pre-modern societies. Marriages between such close relatives were frequent in Ancient Egypt, at least among members of ruling dynasties.

In societies adhering to Jewish or Christian faiths, such marriages were sometimes allowed. The Talmud and Maimonides encourage marriages between uncles and nieces, though some early Jewish religious communities, such as the Sadducees, believed that such unions were prohibited by the Torah. Among medieval and especially early-modern Christians, a marriage between a woman and the sibling of a parent was not always interpreted as violating  Leviticus 18; this was especially so among the royal houses of Europe, and in Catholic countries a papal dispensation could be obtained to allow such a marriage.

Such marriages have traditionally been illegal in Islamic societies and are regarded as prohibited by Islam.

Avunculate marriages were prominent in the House of Habsburg. For example, Charles II of Spain was the son of an uncle and niece, Philip IV and Mariana of Austria; in turn, both of Philip's parents (and therefore both of Mariana's maternal grandparents) were the children of uncle-niece marriages, one of which also produced Mariana's paternal grandfather. As a result, instead of Charles' parents, grandparents, great-grandparents, and great-great-grandparents adding up to 30 different individuals, they numbered only 23.

Avunculate marriage was common among South Indians.  Currently, it is mostly practiced in rural and small to medium cities.  The most common form is where the elder daughter is married away to the youngest maternal uncle. The wedding is usually called Maman Kalyanam (Thai Maman Kalyanam in Tamil Nadu). It was culturally preferred for at least one daughter to be married to an uncle. This is extensively featured as a plot device in many south Indian movies, such as Thaamirabharani and Thai Maaman.

List of historical avunculate marriages
Perictione and her uncle, Pyrilampes
Nahor, son of Terah and his niece, Milcah
Jochebed and her nephew, Amram
Ahmose I and his half-niece, Ahmose-Sitkamose
Thutmose I and his half-aunt, Mutnofret
Smenkhkare and his niece, Meritaten
Pepi II Neferkare and his aunt, Neith
Pinedjem I and his half-aunt, Duathathor-Henuttawy
Menkheperre and his niece, Istemkheb
Shabaka and his aunt, Qalhata
Leonidas, King of Sparta and his half-niece, Gorgo
Arybbas of Epirus and his niece, Troas
Alexander I of Epirus and his niece Cleopatra of Macedon
Lucius Tarquinius Superbus and his brother Arruns Tarquinius respectively married sisters Tullia Major and Tullia Minor, who may have been their nieces. Superbus and Tullia Minor later disposed of their original spouses and married each other.
Herod the Great married an unnamed niece.
Salome I and her uncle Joseph
Antipater II and his half-niece, Mariamne III, who was possibly later married to another half-uncle Herod Archelaus.
Herod Antipas, Tetrarch of Galilee and Perea and his half-niece Herodias. Herodias was previously married to her other half-uncle Herod II.
Salome, the daughter of Herod II and Herodias, married Philip the Tetrarch, who was both her half-uncle and half-granduncle.
Herod of Chalcis and his niece, Berenice
Philip III of Macedon and his half-niece, Eurydice II of Macedon
Mithridates III of Pontus and his grand-niece, Laodice
Seleucus II Callinicus and his aunt Laodice II
Antigonus II Gonatas and his niece Phila
Demetrius II Aetolicus and his half-aunt Stratonice of Macedon
Antiochus X Eusebes and his possible half-aunt Cleopatra Selene of Syria
Ptolemy VIII Physcon and his niece Cleopatra III of Egypt
Ptolemy X Alexander I and his niece Berenice III of Egypt
Ptolemy XII Auletes and his half-niece Cleopatra V
Emperor Hui of Han and his niece Empress Zhang Yan
Sun Xiu and his niece Empress Zhu
Gwangjong of Goryeo and his half-niece Lady Gyeonghwa
Injong of Goryeo and his aunt, Princess Yeondeok and Princess Bokchang
Roman Emperor Claudius and his niece Agrippina the Younger
Tiberius Claudius Atticus Herodes and his niece Vibullia Alcia Agrippina
Byzantine Emperor Heraclius and his niece Martina
Emperor Kōan and his niece Oshihime
Yamato Takeru and his aunt Futaji Irihime
Emperor Kinmei and his half-niece, Ishi-Hime
Emperor Jomei and his niece Empress Kōgyoku,  and his aunt Princess Tame
Emperor Kōtoku and his niece Princess Hashihito
Emperor Tenmu and his nieces Empress Jitō, Princess Ōta, Princess Ōe, and Princess Niitabe
Prince Kusakabe and his aunt Empress Genmei
Emperor Shōmu and his aunt Empress Kōmyō
Musa ibn Musa, Wali of Zaragoza and Governor of Upper March and his half-niece Assona Íñiguez
Emperor Junna and his niece Princess Seishi
Emperor Suzaku and his niece Princess Hiroko
Emperor En'yū and his niece Princess Sonshi
Emperor Go-Ichijō and his aunt Fujiwara no Ishi
Emperor Go-Suzaku and his aunt Fujiwara no Yoshiko
Emperor Go-Suzaku and his niece Fujiwara no Genshi
Emperor Horikawa and his half aunt Princess Tokushi
Emperor Nijō and his half aunt Princess Yoshiko
Emperor Go-Fukakusa and his aunt Fujiwara no Kimiko
Emperor Fushimi and his aunt Tōin Sueko
Anjong of Goryeo and his half-niece Queen Heonjeong
Amaury I, Lord of Craon and his half-grandniece, Jeanne des Roches, Dame of Sablé (1212)
Vietnamese Prince Tran Hung Dao and his consort and paternal aunt, Princess Thien Thanh
Alfonso X of Castile had a concubinage with his paternal half-aunt Maria Alfonso de Leon
Rupert I, Elector Palatine and his great-grandniece Beatrix of Berg (1385)
John, Constable of Portugal and his half-niece, Isabel of Barcelos (1424)
Afonso V of Portugal and his niece, Joanna of Castile (1475)  
Jacques of Savoy, Count of Romont and his niece, Marie of Luxembourg, Countess of Vendôme (1484)
Joanna of Naples and her half-nephew, King Ferdinand II of Naples (1496)
Ferdinand II of Aragon and his half-grandniece, Germaine of Foix (1505)
Philip II of Spain and his niece, Anna of Austria (1570)
Charles II, Archduke of Austria and his niece, Maria Anna of Bavaria (1571)
Ferdinand II, Archduke of Austria, and his niece, Anne Juliana Gonzaga (1582)
Chiefess Kapohauola and her nephew, Chief Kakae
Fernando de Borja y Aragón and his niece, María Francisca de Borja y Aragón
Maximilian I, Elector of Bavaria and his niece, Archduchess Maria Anna of Austria (1635)
Prince Maurice of Savoy and his niece, Princess Luisa Cristina of Savoy (1642)
Karl Eusebius, Prince of Liechtenstein and his niece, Johanna Beatrix of Dietrichstein (1644)
Philip IV of Spain and his niece, Mariana of Austria (1646)
Borso d'Este and his niece, Ippolita d'Este (1647)
Leopold I, Holy Roman Emperor and his niece, Margaret Theresa of Austria (1666).
Voltaire (François-Marie Arouet), lived in concubinage with his niece, Marie Louise Mignot Denis.
Christian, Landgrave of Hesse-Wanfried-Rheinfels and his niece Countess Maria Franziska of Hohenlohe-Bartenstein (1731)
Ferdinand Bonaventura II von Harrach and his niece Maria Rosa von Harrach-Rohrau (1740)
Prince Augustus Ferdinand of Prussia and his niece Margravine Elisabeth Louise of Brandenburg-Schwedt (1755)
Pedro III of Portugal and his niece Maria I of Portugal (1760)
Frederick Erdmann, Prince of Anhalt-Pless and his niece Countess Louise Ferdinande zu Stolberg-Wernigerode (1766)
Prince Benedetto, Duke of Chablais and his half-niece Princess Maria Ana of Savoy (1775)
Infanta Benedita and her nephew, José, Prince of Brazil (1777)
Prince Eugene of Saxe-Hildburghausen and his niece, Caroline of Saxe-Hildburghausen (1778)
Harman Blennerhassett and his niece, Margaret Agnew (1794)
Infante Antonio Pascual of Spain and his niece, Infanta Maria Amalie of Spain (1795)
King Kamehameha the Great of Hawaii and his half-niece, Queen Keōpūolani (c. 1796)
Jorge Tadeo Lozano, President of Cundinamarca (Colombia), and his niece María Tadea Lozano e Isasi (m. 1797)
Sir John Acton, 6th Baronet, Prime Minister of Naples and his niece Marianna Acton (1799)
Francis IV, Duke of Modena, and his niece, Maria Beatrice of Savoy (titular queen of England and Scotland according to the Jacobite succession) (1812)
Ernest Constantine, Landgrave of Hesse-Philippsthal, and his niece, Caroline of Hesse-Philippsthal (1812).
Irineu Evangelista de Sousa, Viscount of Mauá, Brazilian entrepreneur, industrialist, banker and politician (1813), and his niece Maria Joaquina "May" de Sousa Machado (1825).
Leopold, Prince of Salerno and his niece, Archduchess Clementina of Austria (1816).
Infante Carlos, Count of Molina, and his niece, Infanta Maria Francisca of Portugal (1816), and later his niece, Maria Teresa of Portugal (1838)
Kamehameha II and his half-niece Kalani Pauahi
Ferdinand VII of Spain and his niece Maria Isabel of Portugal (1816), and later his niece Maria Christina of the Two Sicilies (1829).
Gustav, Landgrave of Hesse-Homburg and his niece, Princess Louise of Anhalt-Dessau (1818).
Leopold, Grand Duke of Baden and his half-grand niece Princess Sophie of Sweden (1819).
Infante Francisco de Paula of Spain and his niece Princess Luisa Carlotta of the Two Sicilies (1819).
Ernest I, Duke of Saxe-Coburg and Gotha and his niece Duchess Marie of Württemberg (1832).
James Mayer de Rothschild, founder of the French branch of the Rothschild banking family, and his niece Betty Salomon von Rothschild (c. 1825).
Prince Francis, Count of Trapani and his niece Archduchess Maria Isabella of Austria (1850).
Mongkut and his half-grandniece Somanass Waddhanawathy (1851), and his half-grandniece Debsirindra (1851), and later his half-grandniece Phannarai (1851).
Svasti Sobhana and his half-niece Abha Barni, and later his half-niece Chavi Vilaya Gagananga.
Richard von Metternich (son of the famous Austrian Chancellor) and his niece, Pauline von Metternich (1856).
Ignacy Łukasiewicz and his niece, Honorata Stacherska (1857). 
Porfirio Díaz, 33rd President of Mexico, and his niece, Delfina Ortega Díaz (1867).
Duke Nicholas of Württemberg and his half-niece Duchess Wilhelmine of Württemberg (1868).
Prince William of Hesse-Philippsthal-Barchfeld and his half-niece Princess Juliane of Bentheim and Steinfurt (1873), and later his half-niece Princess Adelaide of Bentheim and Steinfurt (1879).
Amadeo I of Spain and his niece, Maria Letizia Bonaparte (1888).
Henryk Sienkiewicz, Polish novelist, and his niece, Maria Babska (1904).
Alois Hitler and his niece Klara Hitler, parents of Adolf Hitler. After they were married, Klara still called her husband "uncle".(1885) Adolf himself declared that his own half-niece Geli Raubal was the only woman he ever loved.
Arturo Grullón, Dominican Republic painter and doctor, and his niece Filomena Grullón (1909).
Anton Mussert and his aunt Maria Witlam (1917).
Norodom Sihanouk and his half-aunt Sisowath Pongsanmoni (1945), and later his half-aunt Sisowath Monikessan.
Julio César Turbay Ayala, 25th President of Colombia, and his niece, Nydia Quintero Turbay (1948).

See also
Consanguinity
Cousin marriage
List of coupled cousins
Sibling marriage

References

Incest
Endogamy